"Player's Ball" is the debut single from hip hop duo Outkast. Originally released two weeks prior on the compilation A LaFace Family Christmas, the single was released on November 19, 1993, to promote the forthcoming debut album, Southernplayalisticadillacmuzik. The song itself discusses the nature of living in the South of the United States, and growing up within a hip hop culture. The accompanying music video was directed by Sean "Puff Daddy" Combs.

The title refers to a traditional gathering of pimps in Atlanta. The song is referenced at least three times within other songs by the duo, including the final track on the debut album, the title track of the debut album, and a later single, "Elevators (Me & You)". The song peaked at #37 on the Billboard Hot 100, making it the highest-charting single from the group's debut album.

When Outkast made a guest appearance on Martin in the February 1995 episode All The Players Came, they also performed the song during the credits. The song was later featured in the 2002 film 8 Mile.

Track listing
 CD Single
 "Player's Ball" (Radio Edit) – 3:56
 "Player's Ball" (Album Version) – 4:22
 "Player's Ball" (TV Mix) – 4:23
 "Player's Ball" (Video Version) – 4:14

 Cassette Single
 "Player's Ball" (Radio Edit) – 3:56
 "Player's Ball" (Album Version) – 4:22
 "Player's Ball" (Instrumental) – 4:14
 "Player's Ball" (TV Mix) – 4:23

 12" Vinyl Single
 "Player's Ball" (Extended Version) – 6:00
 "Player's Ball" (Radio Edit – Dirty) – 3:56
 "Player's Ball" (Radio Edit – Clean) – 4:23
 "Player's Ball" (Remix Version) – 4:27
 "Player's Ball" (Instrumental) – 4:14

 10" 20th Anniversary EP (Green Vinyl)
 "Players Ball" (Dirty Version) – 4:21
 "Players Ball" (Extended Version) – 6:18
 "Ain't No Thang – 5:38
 "Crumblin' Erb" – 5:09

Personnel

 André 3000 – vocals
Big Boi – vocals 
Organized Noize – keyboards, programming, drum programming, producer, mixing engineer
Edward Strout – guitar
Preston Crump – bass

Charts

Weekly charts

Year-end charts

Certifications

References

1993 debut singles
Outkast songs
Songs written by André 3000
1992 songs
Songs written by Big Boi
LaFace Records singles
Song recordings produced by Organized Noize
American Christmas songs
Songs written by Sleepy Brown